Anne Ellen Brodsky (born June 11, 1965) is an American professor in psychology and Gender and Women's Studies at the University of Maryland, Baltimore County (UMBC). She is also the Director of the Gender and Women's Studies Program. Also, she wrote the book, With All Our Strength: The Revolutionary Association of the Women of Afghanistan.

Brodsky is the daughter of Allan J. and Clementine Brodsky of Shaler Township, Allegheny County, Pennsylvania. She attended Shaler Area High School and earned her B.A. from Vassar College, M.A. from and Ph.D. from the University of Maryland, and post-doctorate from the Johns Hopkins School of Public Health.

References

External links
Staff bio

Living people
1965 births
20th-century American Jews
American people of Ukrainian-Jewish descent
People from Shaler Township, Pennsylvania
American women psychologists
21st-century American psychologists
Women's studies academics
University of Maryland, Baltimore County faculty
Vassar College alumni
University System of Maryland alumni
Johns Hopkins University alumni
21st-century American Jews
20th-century American women
21st-century American women
20th-century American psychologists